Institute of High Pressure Physics, also known as Unipress (Polish: Instytut Wysokich Ciśnień Polskiej Akademii Nauk) is a scientific institute founded in 1972 by the Polish Academy of Sciences (PAN).

Main fields of activity
 Biological materials
 Food preservation
 High-pressure instrumentation
 Nanocrystalline materials
 Optoelectronics
 Semiconductors
 Superconductors

Notable people
 Sylwester Porowski

References

External links
 

1972 establishments in Poland
Organizations established in 1972
Institutes of the Polish Academy of Sciences